Radulichnus is an ichnogenus of trace fossil which resembles the marks produced by the action of a mollusc's radula on sediment.  As an ichnogenus, its classification is based solely on appearance, and does not necessarily imply anything of the affinity of the organism which produced the trace.
However, fossils of Kimberella have been found at or near the ends of Radulichnus traces, leading to the suspicion (accepted nearly as fact by some) that the traces were made by Kimberella.

References

Trace fossils